Franco Alejandro Colapinto (born 27 May 2003) is an Argentine-Italian racing driver who is currently competing in FIA Formula 3 for MP Motorsport. He is the 2019 F4 Spanish champion and a race winner in the European Le Mans Series. He is a member of the Williams Driver Academy.

Career

Karting 
Colapinto started karting at the age of nine. He won the Argentinian Championship in 2016 and again in 2018, alongside a victory in the 2018 Youth Summer Olympics.

Lower formulae 

Colapinto made his car racing debut in 2018, participating in the final round of the F4 Spanish Championship, driving for Drivex School. In 2019 Colapinto signed with  FARacing by Drivex for a full campaign in the F4 Spanish Championship. He took the title by winning all three races in the season finale bringing his debut car racing season tally to eleven victories, 13 podiums and 14 pole positions.

Euroformula Open 
During the 2019 season, Colapinto drove for Drivex as a guest driver in the 2019 round at Circuit de Spa-Francorchamps.

Formula Renault Eurocup 
Drivex also ran Colapinto during the 2019 season at Spa and Catalunya. In July 2020, Colapinto joined the championship full-time with Dutch outfit MP Motorsport.

Toyota Racing Series 
In January 2020, Colapinto joined Kiwi Motorsport for the 2020 championship. The season saw him claim a race win in Hampton Downs and further 7 podiums and end the championship third overall, clinching the rookie championship win.

FIA Formula 3

2022 
In October 2020, Colapinto joined MP Motorsport for the first day of post-season testing at Catalunya. He did likewise the following year at Valencia, but ended up signing for Van Amersfoort Racing instead for the 2022 season, partnering Rafael Villagómez and Reece Ushijima. The Argentinian started his F3 career with a pole position on his and his team's debut in the series at Sakhir. He went on to win the Sprint Race at the following round in Imola, scoring his and VAR's maiden victory in the series. Throughout the season Colapinto took three more podium finishes at the Spielberg, Budapest and Zandvoort rounds and a second Sprint Race win at the final round in Monza to finish ninth in the drivers' standings.

2023 
In September, Colapinto partook in the 2022 post-season test, again with MP Motorsport. On January 9, 2023, he was announced as MP Motorsport's driver for the 2023 season.

Colapinto qualified 12th and consequently claimed pole position for the Sprint Race, where he crossed the line in second place behind Pepe Martí. He finished 10th in the Feature Race on Sunday.

Asian Le Mans Series 
In February 2021, Colapinto joined G-Drive Racing #25 for the 2021 season. The season saw him claim 3 podiums in 4 races, and end the championship third overall, with his co-drivers Rui Andrade and John Falb.

Formula One 
In January 2023, Colapinto was announced to be joining the Williams Driver Academy.

Karting record

Karting career summary

Racing record

Racing career summary 

† As Colapinto was a guest driver, he was ineligible for points.
* Season still in progress.

Complete F4 Spanish Championship results 
(key) (Races in bold indicate pole position) (Races in italics indicate fastest lap)

Complete Formula Renault Eurocup results 
(key) (Races in bold indicate pole position) (Races in italics indicate fastest lap)

† As Colapinto was a guest driver, he was ineligible for points.
‡ Half points awarded as less than 75% of race distance was completed.

Complete Toyota Racing Series results 
(key) (Races in bold indicate pole position) (Races in italics indicate fastest lap)

Complete Asian Le Mans Series results 
(key) (Races in bold indicate pole position) (Races in italics indicate fastest lap)

Complete Formula Regional European Championship results 
(key) (Races in bold indicate pole position) (Races in italics indicate fastest lap)

† Driver did not finish the race, but was classified as they completed more than 90% of the race distance.

Complete European Le Mans Series results

Complete 24 Hours of Le Mans results

Complete FIA Formula 3 Championship results 
(key) (Races in bold indicate pole position; races in italics indicate points for the fastest lap of top ten finishers)

References

External links
 
 

2003 births
Living people
Argentine racing drivers
Spanish F4 Championship drivers
Formula Renault Eurocup drivers
Euroformula Open Championship drivers
Toyota Racing Series drivers
Blancpain Endurance Series drivers
Formula Regional European Championship drivers
FIA World Endurance Championship drivers
24 Hours of Le Mans drivers
European Le Mans Series drivers
Asian Le Mans Series drivers
MP Motorsport drivers
FIA Formula 3 Championship drivers
Van Amersfoort Racing drivers
G-Drive Racing drivers
W Racing Team drivers
Drivex drivers
Karting World Championship drivers
FA Racing drivers
Audi Sport drivers
Competitors at the 2018 Summer Youth Olympics